Horsfield may refer to:

People
 Andy Horsfield, British music industry entrepreneur
 Arthur Horsfield (born 1946), English football striker
 Craigie Horsfield (born 1949, English artist and photographer
 Debbie Horsfield (born 1955), English theatre and television writer
 Geoff Horsfield (born 1973), English footballer
 George Horsfield (1882-1956), British architect and archaeologist
 Gordon Horsfield (1913–1982), Australian cricketer
 James Horsfield (born 1995), English footballer
 Julia A. Horsfield, New Zealand biochemist and developmental geneticist
 Kate Horsfield (born 1944), American artist
 Kenneth Horsfield, George Medal recipient
 Neil Horsfield (born 1966), Welsh athlete
 Noel Horsfield (1913–1988), South African Olympic sailor
 Sam Horsfield (born 1996), English professional golfer
 Susan Horsfield (born 1928), British artist
 Thomas Horsfield (1775–1859), American physician and naturalist
 Thomas Walker Horsfield (christened 1792-1837), English minister and historian

Places
 Horsfield Bay, New South Wales, Australia
 The Horsfield, a cricket ground in Colne, Lancashire, England

See also
 
 Horsfield's tortoise, a species
 Horsefield (disambiguation)
 Horfield, a suburb of the city of Bristol, southwest England